James Thomas Farnan (12 July 1875 – 9 August 1916) was an Australian rules footballer who played with St Kilda in the Victorian Football League (VFL). He was killed in action in France in World War I.

Family
One of the five children of the Australian (bare-knuckle) heavyweight boxing champion, William Francis "Billy" Farnan (1851–1891), and Bridget Winifred Farnan (1853–1912), née Kane, James Thomas Farnan was born at Emerald Hill (now known as South Melbourne) on 12 July 1875.

Footballer
Recruited from Montague, he played one senior game for St Kilda, on the half-back flank, against Essendon, at the East Melbourne Cricket Ground on 8 July 1899 (round nine). Essendon won by 79 points, 11.19 (85) to 1.0 (6) (St Kilda did not score at all in the last three-quarters).

Military service
He enlisted, aged 40, in the First AIF on 7 August 1915. He gave his occupation as packer and his status as single.

Death
Private James Farnan, of the 46th Battalion Australian Infantry was killed in action, in France, on 9 August 1916.

He was buried at the Pozieres British Cemetery, at Ovillers-la-Boisselle, in France. His name is located at panel 141 in the Commemorative Area at the Australian War Memorial.

See also
 List of Victorian Football League players who died in active service

Footnotes

References
 Australian War Memorial: Roll of Honour "Circular": Private James Thomas Farnan (3736), collection of the Australian War Memorial.
 World War I Embarkation Roll: Private James Farnan (3736), collection of the Australian War Memorial.
 World War I Nominal Roll: Private James Farnan (3736), collection of the Australian War Memorial.
 World War I Service Record: Private James Farnan (3736), collection of the National Archives of Australia.

External links

 

1875 births
1916 deaths
St Kilda Football Club players
Australian military personnel killed in World War I
Australian rules footballers from Melbourne